Holly Kristen Piirainen (January 19, 1983 – August 5, 1993) was a 10-year-old American murder victim from Grafton, Massachusetts. She and her brother had been visiting their grandparents in Sturbridge, Massachusetts when Holly was murdered.

Disappearance 
Prior to her disappearance Piirainen and her family were staying at a family-owned lakefront cottage in Sturbridge. Piirainen and her brother had gone to a neighbor's house to see puppies. Her brother had returned to the cottage where the grandparents lived, but Piirainen did not. 

Her father last saw Piirainen at 11:45 am prior to the siblings leaving to look at the puppies and reported her missing when she did not return. While waiting for police the family began to search for her and were aided by local and state police, sheriff's departments and units from Connecticut and Rhode Island. One of Piirainen's shoes was found by the side of a road.

Searching for Piirainen took two months. On October 23, 1993, Piirainen's remains were found by hunters in Brimfield, Massachusetts. The killer still has not been found.

Investigation
Many investigators have theorized that the abduction of Piirainen was random as very few people knew that the family was in the area, and fewer knew that the children would be looking at puppies that day.

Fellow Massachusetts resident Molly Bish disappeared on June 27, 2000, while working as a lifeguard on Comins Pond in Warren, Massachusetts. Her body was also found in a wooded area in Hampden County on June 9, 2003,  from her family home. Police considered the possibility that the two cases could be related. A former Springfield resident, David Pouliot, is considered a person of interest in both cases. It was discovered that Bish had written a letter to Holly Piirainen's family following Holly's disappearance. This is an excerpt from Molly Bish's letter:

On January 3, 2012, Hampden County Attorney Mark Mastroianni announced that forensic evidence found near Piirainen's body had been linked to Pouliot, a suspect who died in 2003. Investigators have not disclosed the nature of the forensic evidence, nor the type of testing that linked Pouliot to the evidence. Investigators said that, although Pouliot is a person of interest in the crime,  he has not yet formally been named a suspect. Pouliot frequently hunted and fished around the area where Piirainen's body was found.

In October 2020 Boston news station WCVB-TV reported that according to their sources, the body of a 22-year-old man was exhumed at a cemetery in Hampden County, in Massachusetts, which might be connected to the investigation into the disappearance and murder of Piirainen. Sources told the news station that the man exhumed was not Pouliot.

According to Springfield, Massachusetts based TV station, Western Mass News, Holly's cousin, Leah Jolin, said investigators were searching for a letter placed in the subject's coffin that could advance the case. But Jolin said the retrieved item had suffered a lot of water damage after over two decades in the ground. "So basically we have been told they're not really sure they're going to find anything useful,” Jolin said.

Legacy 
Since Piirainen's death, the Holly Piirainen Scholarship Fund was established in her memory by her family. Piirainen is included in a group memorial called the Garden of Peace in Boston, which memorializes Massachusetts victims of homicide.

In March 2021 the family issued a statement urging for any information about Piirainen's disappearance and death and the helpfulness of DNA testing after it helped solve the murder of Virginia Hannon.

See also
List of solved missing person cases
List of unsolved murders

References

External links
Another Went Missing: Holly Kristen Piirainen
Another Went Missing Holly Piirainen Taken 10 Years Ago
Children Who Never Made It Home
New England's Unsolved - Fox 25
Massachusett's Cold Cases

1993 murders in the United States
1993 in Massachusetts
August 1993 events in the United States
August 1993 crimes
American people of Finnish descent
Deaths by person in Massachusetts
Female murder victims
Formerly missing people
Missing person cases in Massachusetts
Murdered American children
People from Grafton, Massachusetts
People murdered in Massachusetts
Unsolved murders in the United States
Incidents of violence against girls
Sturbridge, Massachusetts